Pallakkal Pothukudi is a village under Pappakudi panchayat union in Ambasamudram taluk of Tirunelveli district. Primary occupation of the people is Agriculture

Geography
It is situated in Ambasamudram- Alangulam Road surrounded by Adaichani and Pananjadi. It has a Panchayat Union Primary School and Government higher secondary school.

References

External links
 

Villages in Tirunelveli district